Ammonium diethyl dithiophosphate or more systematically ammonium O,O′-diethyl dithiophosphate, is the ammonium salt of diethyl dithiophosphoric acid. It is used as a source of the (C2H5O)2PS2− ligand in coordination chemistry and in analytical chemistry for determination of various ions. It can be obtained by the reaction of phosphorus pentasulfide with ethanol and ammonia. In crystal structure of this compound the ammonium cation is connected by four charge-assisted N—H···S hydrogen bonds to four tetrahedral diethyl dithiophosphate anions.

See also
 Dimethyl dithiophosphoric acid
 Zinc dithiophosphate

References

Phosphorothioates
Ethyl esters
Ammonium compounds